Elections for the second Knesset were held in Israel on 30 July 1951. Voter turnout was 75.1%.

Results

Aftermath
The second Knesset was highly unstable, with four separate governments, two different Prime Ministers and several defections; Rostam Bastuni, Avraham Berman and Moshe Sneh left Mapam and set up the Left Faction. Bastuni later returned to Mapam whilst Berman and Sneh joined Maki. Hannah Lamdan and David Livschitz also left Mapam, establishing the Faction independent of Ahdut HaAvoda before joining Mapai. Four other members left Mapam to found Ahdut HaAvoda – Poale Zion, but the move was not recognised by the Knesset speaker. During the Knesset term, Sephardim and Oriental Communities joined the General Zionists.

As with the first Knesset, the speaker was Yosef Sprinzak.

Third government

The second Knesset started with David Ben-Gurion forming the third government of Israel (the first Knesset had two governments) on 8 October 1951. His Mapai party formed a coalition with Mizrachi, Hapoel HaMizrachi, Agudat Yisrael, Agudat Yisrael Workers and the three Israeli Arab parties, the Democratic List for Israeli Arabs, Progress and Work and Agriculture and Development. Like the first Knesset, there were 15 ministers. The government resigned on 19 December 1952 due to a dispute with the religious parties over religious education.

Fourth government

Ben-Gurion formed the fourth government on 24 December 1952, dropping the ultra-orthodox parties (Agudat Yisrael and Agudat Yisrael Workers) and replacing them with the General Zionists and the Progressive Party. The new government had 16 ministers. Ben-Gurion resigned on 6 December 1953 as he wished to settle in the Negev kibbutz of Sde Boker.

Fifth government

Moshe Sharett formed the fifth government on 26 January 1954 with the same coalition partners and ministers. Sharett resigned on 29 June 1955, when the General Zionists refused to abstain from voting on a motion of no-confidence brought by Herut and Maki over the government's position on the trial of Malchiel Gruenwald, who had accused Rudolf Kastner of collaborating with the Nazis.

Sixth government

Sharett formed the sixth government on 29 June 1955, eliminating the General Zionists and the Progressive Party from the coalition and reducing the number of ministers to 12. The new government did not last long, as a general election was called for 26 July 1955.

See also
List of members of the second Knesset

References

External links
Historical overview of the Second Knesset Knesset website
Knesset Elections Results: Second Knesset Knesset website
Factional and Government Make-Up of the Second Knesset Knesset website

1951 elections in Israel
Legislative election
Legislative elections in Israel
July 1951 events in Asia
Israel